Jawaharlal Nehru ( or ; ;  ; 14 November 1889 – 27 May 1964) was an Indian anti-colonial nationalist, secular humanist, social democrat, statesman and author who was a central figure in India during the middle of the 20th century. Nehru was a principal leader of the Indian nationalist movement in the 1930s and 1940s. Upon India's independence in 1947, he became the first Prime Minister of India, serving for 16 years. Nehru promoted parliamentary democracy, secularism, and science and technology during the 1950s, powerfully influencing India's arc as a modern nation. In international affairs, he steered India clear of the two blocs of the Cold War. A well-regarded author, his books written in prison, such as Letters from a Father to His Daughter (1929),  Glimpses of World History (1934), An Autobiography (1936), and The Discovery of India (1946), have been read around the world. The honorific Pandit has been commonly applied before his name.

The son of Motilal Nehru, a prominent lawyer and Indian nationalist, Jawaharlal Nehru was educated in England—at Harrow School and Trinity College, Cambridge, and trained in the law at the Inner Temple. He became a barrister, returned to India, enrolled at the Allahabad High Court but never got truly interested in legal profession. Instead he gradually began to take an interest in national politics, which eventually became a full-time occupation. He joined the Indian National Congress, rose to become the leader of a progressive faction during the 1920s, and eventually of the Congress, receiving the support of Mahatma Gandhi who was to designate Nehru as his political heir. As Congress president in 1929, Nehru called for complete independence from the British Raj. Nehru and the Congress dominated Indian politics during the 1930s. Nehru promoted the idea of the secular nation-state in the 1937 Indian provincial elections, allowing the Congress to sweep the elections, and to form governments in several provinces. In September 1939, the Congress ministries resigned to protest Viceroy Lord Linlithgow's decision to join the war without consulting them. After the All India Congress Committee's Quit India Resolution of 8 August 1942, senior Congress leaders were imprisoned and for a time the organisation was crushed. Nehru, who had reluctantly heeded Gandhi's call for immediate independence, and had desired instead to support the Allied war effort during World War II, came out of a lengthy prison term to a much-altered political landscape. The Muslim League, under Muhammad Ali Jinnah, had come to dominate Muslim politics in the interim. In the 1946 provincial elections, Congress won the elections, but the League won all the seats reserved for Muslims, which the British interpreted to be a clear mandate for Pakistan in some form. Nehru became the interim prime minister of India in September 1946, with the League joining his government with some hesitancy in October 1946.

Upon India's independence on 15 August 1947, Nehru gave a critically acclaimed speech, "Tryst with Destiny"; he was sworn in as the Dominion of India's prime minister and raised the Indian flag at the Red Fort in Delhi. On 26 January 1950, when India became a republic within the Commonwealth of Nations, Nehru became the Republic of India's first prime minister. He embarked on an ambitious program of economic, social, and political reforms. Nehru promoted a pluralistic multi-party democracy. In foreign affairs, he played a leading role in establishing the Non-Aligned Movement, a group of nations that did not seek membership in the two main ideological blocs of the Cold War.

Under Nehru's leadership, the Congress emerged as a catch-all party, dominating national and state-level politics and winning elections in 1951, 1957 and 1962. Nehru remained popular with the Indian people and his premiership spanning 16 years, 286 days—which is, to date, longest in India—ended with his death on 27 May 1964 due to a heart attack. 

Widely recognized as the greatest figure of modern India after Mahatma Gandhi, Nehru is also hailed as the "architect of Modern India", for his contributions in nation building, securing democracy, and preventing an ethnic civil war. His birthday is celebrated as Children's Day in India.

Early life and career (1889–1912)

Birth and family background 

Jawaharlal Nehru was born on 14 November 1889 in Allahabad in British India. His father, Motilal Nehru (1861–1931), a self-made wealthy barrister who belonged to the Kashmiri Pandit community, served twice as president of the Indian National Congress, in 1919 and 1928. His mother, Swarup Rani Thussu (1868–1938), who came from a well-known Kashmiri Brahmin family settled in Lahore, was Motilal's second wife, his first having died in childbirth. Jawaharlal was the eldest of three children. His elder sister, Vijaya Lakshmi, later became the first female president of the United Nations General Assembly. His youngest sister, Krishna Hutheesing, became a noted writer and authored several books on her brother.

Childhood 

Nehru described his childhood as a "sheltered and uneventful one". He grew up in an atmosphere of privilege at wealthy homes, including a palatial estate called the Anand Bhavan. His father had him educated at home by private governesses and tutors. Influenced by the Irish theosophist Ferdinand T. Brooks' teaching, Nehru became interested in science and theosophy. A family friend, Annie Besant subsequently initiated him into the Theosophical Society at age thirteen. However, his interest in theosophy did not prove to be enduring, and he left the society shortly after Brooks departed as his tutor. He wrote: "for nearly three years [Brooks] was with me and in many ways, he influenced me greatly".

Nehru's theosophical interests had induced him to the study of the Buddhist and Hindu scriptures. According to B. R. Nanda, these scriptures were Nehru's "first introduction to the religious and cultural heritage of [India]. ...[They] provided Nehru the initial impulse for [his] long intellectual quest which culminated…in The Discovery of India."

Youth 

Nehru became an ardent nationalist during his youth. The Second Boer War and the Russo-Japanese War intensified his feelings. Of the latter he wrote, "[The] Japanese victories [had] stirred up my enthusiasm. ...Nationalistic ideas filled my mind. ... I mused of Indian freedom and Asiatic freedom from the thraldom of Europe." Later, in 1905, when he had begun his institutional schooling at Harrow, a leading school in England where he was nicknamed "Joe", G. M. Trevelyan's Garibaldi books, which he had received as prizes for academic merit, influenced him greatly. He viewed Garibaldi as a revolutionary hero. He wrote: "Visions of similar deeds in India came before, of [my] gallant fight for [Indian] freedom and in my mind, India and Italy got strangely mixed together."

Graduation 

Nehru went to Trinity College, Cambridge, in October 1907 and graduated with an honours degree in natural science in 1910. During this period, he studied politics, economics, history and literature with interest. The writings of Bernard Shaw, H. G. Wells, John Maynard Keynes, Bertrand Russell, Lowes Dickinson and Meredith Townsend moulded much of his political and economic thinking.

After completing his degree in 1910, Nehru moved to London and studied law at the Inner temple Inn. During this time, he continued to study Fabian Society scholars including Beatrice Webb. He was called to the Bar in 1912.

Advocate practice 

After returning to India in August 1912, Nehru enrolled as an advocate of the Allahabad High Court and tried to settle down as a barrister. But, unlike his father, he had very little interest in his profession and relished neither the practice of law nor the company of lawyers: "Decidedly the atmosphere was not intellectually stimulating and a sense of the utter insipidity of life grew upon me." His involvement in nationalist politics was to gradually replace his legal practice.

Nationalist movement (1912–1938)

Britain and return to India: 1912–1913 
Nehru had developed an interest in Indian politics during his time in Britain as a student and a barrister. Within months of his return to India in 1912, Nehru attended an annual session of the Indian National Congress in Patna. Congress in 1912 was the party of moderates and elites, and he was disconcerted by what he saw as "very much an English-knowing upper-class affair". Nehru doubted the effectiveness of Congress but agreed to work for the party in support of the Indian civil rights movement led by Mahatma Gandhi in South Africa, collecting funds for the movement in 1913. Later, he campaigned against indentured labour and other such discrimination faced by Indians in the British colonies.

World War I: 1914–1915 
When World War I broke out, sympathy in India was divided. Although educated Indians "by and large took a vicarious pleasure" in seeing the British rulers humbled, the ruling upper classes sided with the Allies. Nehru confessed he viewed the war with mixed feelings. As Frank Moraes writes, "[i]f [Nehru's] sympathy was with any country it was with France, whose culture he greatly admired". During the war, Nehru volunteered for the St. John Ambulance and worked as one of the organisation's provincial secretaries Allahabad. He also spoke out against the censorship acts passed by the British government in India.

Nehru emerged from the war years as a leader whose political views were considered radical. Although the political discourse at the time had been dominated by the moderate, Gopal Krishna Gokhale, who said that it was "madness to think of independence," Nehru had spoken, "openly of the politics of non-cooperation, of the need of resigning from honorary positions under the government and of not continuing the futile politics of representation". He ridiculed the Indian Civil Service for supporting British policies. He noted someone had once defined the Indian Civil Service, "with which we are unfortunately still afflicted in this country, as neither Indian, nor civil, nor a service". Motilal Nehru, a prominent moderate leader, acknowledged the limits of constitutional agitation, but counselled his son that there was no other "practical alternative" to it. Nehru, however, was dissatisfied with the pace of the national movement. He became involved with aggressive nationalists leaders demanding Home Rule for Indians.

The influence of moderates on Congress' politics waned after Gokhale died in 1915. Anti-moderate leaders like Annie Besant and Bal Gangadhar Tilak took the opportunity to call for a national movement for Home Rule. However, in 1915, the proposal was rejected because of the reluctance of the moderates to commit to such a radical course of action.

Home rule movement: 1916–1917 

Nehru married Kamala Kaul in 1916. Their only daughter Indira was born a year later in 1917. Kamala gave birth to a boy in November 1924, but he lived for only a week.

Nevertheless, Besant formed a league for advocating Home Rule in 1916. Tilak, after releasing from a term in prison, had formed his own league in April 1916. Nehru joined both leagues, but worked primarily for the former. He remarked later that "[Besant] had a very powerful influence on me in my childhood  ... even later when I entered political life her influence continued." Another development that brought about a radical change in Indian politics was the espousal of Hindu-Muslim unity with the Lucknow Pact at the annual meeting of the Congress in December 1916. The pact had been initiated earlier in the year at Allahabad at a meeting of the All India Congress Committee, which was held at the Nehru residence at Anand Bhawan. Nehru welcomed and encouraged the rapprochement between the two Indian communities.

Several nationalist leaders banded together in 1916 under the leadership of Annie Besant to voice a demand for self-governance, and to obtain the status of a Dominion within the British Empire as enjoyed at the time by Australia, Canada, South Africa, New Zealand and Newfoundland. Nehru joined the movement and rose to become secretary of Besant's Home Rule League.

In June 1917, the British government arrested and interned Besant. The Congress and other Indian organisations threatened to launch protests if she was not freed. Subsequently, the British government was forced to release Besant and make significant concessions after a period of intense protest.

Non-co-operation: 1920–1927 
Nehru's first big national involvement came at the onset of the non-co-operation movement in 1920. He led the movement in the United Provinces (now Uttar Pradesh). Nehru was arrested on charges of anti-governmental activities in 1921 and released a few months later. In the rift that formed within the Congress following Gandhi's sudden halting of the non-Cooperation movement after the Chauri Chaura incident, Nehru remained loyal to him and did not join the Swaraj Party formed by his father Motilal Nehru and CR Das.  In 1923, Nehru was imprisoned in Nabha, a princely state, when he went there to see the struggle that was being waged by the Sikhs against the corrupt Mahants.

Internationalising the struggle for Indian independence: 1927 
Nehru played a leading role in the development of the internationalist outlook of the Indian independence struggle. He sought foreign allies for India and forged links with movements for independence and democracy around the world. In 1927, his efforts paid off, and the Congress was invited to attend the congress of oppressed nationalities in Brussels, Belgium. The meeting was called to co-ordinate and plan a common struggle against imperialism. Nehru represented India and was elected to the Executive Council of the League against Imperialism that was born at this meeting.

Increasingly, Nehru saw the struggle for independence from British imperialism as a multinational effort by the various colonies and dominions of the Empire; some of his statements on this matter, however, were interpreted as complicity with the rise of Hitler and his espoused intentions. Faced with these allegations, Nehru responded:We have sympathy for the national movement of Arabs in Palestine because it is directed against British Imperialism. Our sympathies cannot be weakened by the fact that the national movement coincides with Hitler's interests.

Fundamental Rights and Economic Policy: 1929 

Nehru drafted the policies of the Congress and a future Indian nation in 1929. He declared the aims of the congress were freedom of religion; right to form associations; freedom of expression of thought; equality before law for every individual without distinction of caste, colour, creed, or religion; protection of regional languages and cultures, safeguarding the interests of the peasants and labour; abolition of untouchability; introduction of adult franchise; imposition of prohibition, nationalisation of industries; socialism; and the establishment of a secular India. All these aims formed the core of the "Fundamental Rights and Economic Policy" resolution drafted by Nehru in 1929–1931 and were ratified in 1931 by the Congress party session at Karachi chaired by Vallabhbhai Patel.

Declaration of independence 
Nehru was one of the first leaders to demand that the Congress Party should resolve to make a complete and explicit break from all ties with the British Empire. The Madras session of Congress in 1927, approved his resolution for independence despite Gandhi's criticism. Gandhi wrote to Nehru:  you are going too fast... Most of the resolutions you framed and got carried could have been delayed for one year... But I do not mind these acts of yours so much as I mind your encouraging mischief-makers and hooligans. I do not know whether you still believe in unadulterated non-violence.Nehru replied:you were supreme; you were in your element and automatically you took the right step. But since you came out of prison something seems to have gone wrong and you have been very obviously ill at ease... All you have said is that within a year or eighteen months you expected the khadi movement to spread rapidly and in a geometric ratio and then some direct action in the political field might be indulged in. Several years and eighteen months have passed since then and the miracle has not happened. It was difficult to believe it would happen but faith in your amazing capacity to bring off the impossible kept us in an expectant mood. But such faith for an irreligious person like me is a poor reed to rely on and I am beginning to think if we are to wait for freedom till khadi becomes universal in India we shall have to wait till the Greek Kalends.At that time, he formed the Independence for India League, a pressure group within the Congress. In 1928, Gandhi agreed to Nehru's demands and proposed a resolution that called for the British to grant Dominion status to India within two years. If the British failed to meet the deadline, the Congress would call upon all Indians to fight for complete independence. Nehru was one of the leaders who objected to the time given to the British—he pressed Gandhi to demand immediate actions from the British. Gandhi brokered a further compromise by reducing the time given from two years to one.
The British rejected demands for Dominion status in 1929. Nehru assumed the presidency of the Congress party during the Lahore session on 29 December 1929 and introduced a successful resolution calling for complete independence. Nehru drafted the Indian declaration of independence, which stated:

We believe that it is the inalienable right of the Indian people, as of any other people, to have freedom and to enjoy the fruits of their toil and have the necessities of life, so that they may have full opportunities for growth. We believe also that if any government deprives a people of these rights and oppresses them the people have a further right to alter it or abolish it. The British government in India has not only deprived the Indian people of their freedom but has based itself on the exploitation of the masses, and has ruined India economically, politically, culturally, and spiritually. We believe, therefore, that India must sever the British connection and attain Purna Swaraj or complete independence.

At midnight on New Year's Eve 1929, Nehru hoisted the tricolour flag of India upon the banks of the Ravi in Lahore. A pledge of independence was read out, which included a readiness to withhold taxes. The massive gathering of the public attending the ceremony was asked if they agreed with it, and the majority of people were witnessed raising their hands in approval. 172 Indian members of central and provincial legislatures resigned in support of the resolution and in accordance with Indian public sentiment. The Congress asked the people of India to observe 26 January as Independence Day. Congress volunteers, nationalists, and the public hoisted the flag of India publicly across India. Plans for mass civil disobedience were also underway.

After the Lahore session of the Congress in 1929, Nehru gradually emerged as the paramount leader of the Indian independence movement. Gandhi stepped back into a more spiritual role. Although Gandhi did not explicitly designate Nehru as his political heir until 1942, as early as the mid-1930s, the country saw Nehru as the natural successor to Gandhi.

Salt March: 1930 
Nehru and most of the Congress leaders were ambivalent initially about Gandhi's plan to begin civil disobedience with a satyagraha aimed at the British salt tax. After the protest had gathered steam, they realised the power of salt as a symbol. Nehru remarked about the unprecedented popular response, "it seemed as though a spring had been suddenly released". He was arrested on 14 April 1930 while on a train from Allahabad for Raipur. Earlier, after addressing a huge meeting and leading a vast procession, he had ceremoniously manufactured some contraband salt. He was charged with breach of the salt law and sentenced to six months of imprisonment at Central Jail.

He nominated Gandhi to succeed him as the Congress president during his absence in jail, but Gandhi declined, and Nehru nominated his father as his successor. With Nehru's arrest, the civil disobedience acquired a new tempo, and arrests, firing on crowds and lathi charges grew to be ordinary occurrences.

Salt satyagraha success 
The salt satyagraha ("pressure for reform through passive resistance") succeeded in attracting world attention. Indian, British, and world opinion increasingly recognised the legitimacy of the claims by the Congress party for independence. Nehru considered the salt satyagraha the high-water mark of his association with Gandhi, and felt its lasting importance was in changing the attitudes of Indians:

Of course these movements exercised tremendous pressure on the British Government and shook the government machinery. But the real importance, to my mind, lay in the effect they had on our own people, and especially the village masses. ... Non-cooperation dragged them out of the mire and gave them self-respect and self-reliance. ... They acted courageously and did not submit so easily to unjust oppression; their outlook widened and they began to think a little in terms of India as a whole. ... It was a remarkable transformation and the Congress, under Gandhi's leadership, must have the credit for it.

Electoral politics, Europe, and economics: 1936–1938 

Nehru's trip to Europe in 1936 happened to be the turning point in his political and economic mindset. It's the visit that sparked his interest in Marxism and his socialist thought pattern. Time later spent incarcerated enabled him to research Marxism more deeply. Appealed by its ideas but repelled by some of its tactics, he never could bring himself to buy Karl Marx's words as revealed gospel. However, from that time on, the benchmark of his economic view remained Marxist, adapted, where necessary, to Indian circumstances.

Nehru spent the early months of 1936 in Switzerland visiting his ailing wife in Lausanne, where she died in March. While in Europe, he became very concerned with the possibility of another world war. At that time, he emphasised that, in the event of war, India's place was alongside the democracies, though he insisted India could only fight in support of Great Britain and France as a free country.

At its 1936 Lucknow session, despite opposition from the newly elected Nehru as the party president, the Congress party agreed to contest the provincial elections to be held in 1937 under the Government of India Act 1935. The elections brought the Congress party to power in a majority of the provinces with increased popularity and power for Nehru. Since the Muslim League under Muhammad Ali Jinnah (who was to become the creator of Pakistan) had fared badly at the polls, Nehru declared that the only two parties that mattered in India were the British colonial authorities and the Congress. Jinnah's statements that the Muslim League was the third and "equal partner" within Indian politics were widely rejected. Nehru had hoped to elevate Maulana Azad as the preeminent leader of Indian Muslims, but Gandhi, who continued to treat Jinnah as the voice of Indian Muslims, undermined him in this.

In the 1930s, under the leadership of Jayaprakash Narayan, Narendra Deo, and others, the Congress Socialist Party group was formed within the INC. Though Nehru never joined the group, he acted as a bridge between them and Gandhi. He had the support of left-wing Congressmen Maulana Azad and Subhas Chandra Bose. The trio combined to oust Rajendra Prasad as the Congress president in 1936. Nehru was elected in his place and held the presidency for two years (1936–37). His socialist colleagues Bose (1938–39) and Azad (1940–46) succeeded him. During Nehru's second term as general secretary of the Congress, he proposed certain resolutions concerning the foreign policy of India. From then on, he was given carte blanche ("blank cheque") in framing the foreign policy of any future Indian nation. Nehru worked closely with Bose in developing good relations with governments of free countries all over the world.

Nehru was one of the first nationalist leaders to realise the sufferings of the people in the states ruled by Indian princes. The nationalist movement had been confined to the territories under direct British rule. He helped to make the struggle of the people in the princely states a part of the nationalist movement for independence. Nehru was also given the responsibility of planning the economy of a future India and appointed the National Planning Commission in 1938 to help frame such policies. However, many of the plans framed by Nehru and his colleagues would come undone with the unexpected partition of India in 1947.

The All India States Peoples Conference (AISPC) was formed in 1927 and Nehru, who had supported the cause of the people of the princely states for many years, was made the organisation's president in 1939. He opened up its ranks to membership from across the political spectrum. AISPC was to play an important role during the political integration of India, helping Indian leaders Vallabhbhai Patel and V. P. Menon (to whom Nehru had delegated integrating the princely states into India) negotiate with hundreds of princes.

Nationalist movement (1939–1947) 

When World War II began, Viceroy Linlithgow had unilaterally declared India a belligerent on the side of Britain, without consulting the elected Indian representatives. Nehru hurried back from a visit to China, announcing that, in a conflict between democracy and fascism, "our sympathies must inevitably be on the side of democracy, ... I should like India to play its full part and throw all her resources into the struggle for a new order".

After much deliberation, the Congress under Nehru informed the government that it would co-operate with the British but on certain conditions. First, Britain must give an assurance of full independence for India after the war and allow the election of a constituent assembly to frame a new constitution; second, although the Indian armed forces would remain under the British Commander-in-chief, Indians must be included immediately in the central government and given a chance to share power and responsibility. When Nehru presented Lord Linlithgow with these demands, he chose to reject them. A deadlock was reached: "The same old game is played again," Nehru wrote bitterly to Gandhi, "the background is the same, the various epithets are the same and the actors are the same and the results must be the same".

On 23 October 1939, the Congress condemned the Viceroy's attitude and called upon the Congress ministries in the various provinces to resign in protest. Before this crucial announcement, Nehru urged Jinnah and the Muslim League to join the protest, but Jinnah declined.

As Nehru had firmly placed India on the path of democracy and freedom at a time when the world was under the threat of Fascism, he and Bose split in the late 1930s when the latter agreed to seek the help of Fascists in driving the British out of India. At the same time, Nehru had supported the Republicans who were fighting against Francisco Franco's forces in the Spanish Civil War. Nehru and his aide V. K. Krishna Menon visited Spain and declared support for the Republicans. When Benito Mussolini, dictator of Italy, expressed his desire to meet, Nehru refused him.

Civil disobedience, Lahore Resolution, August Offer: 1940 

In March 1940, Muhammad Ali Jinnah passed what came to be known as the Pakistan Resolution, declaring that, "Muslims are a nation according to any definition of a nation, and they must have their homelands, their territory and their State." This state was to be known as Pakistan, meaning 'Land of the Pure'. Nehru angrily declared that "all the old problems ... pale into insignificance before the latest stand taken by the Muslim League leader in Lahore". Linlithgow made Nehru an offer on 8 October 1940, which stated that Dominion status for India was the objective of the British government. However, it referred neither to a date nor a method to accomplish this. Only Jinnah received something more precise: "The British would not contemplate transferring power to a Congress-dominated national government, the authority of which was denied by various elements in India's national life".

In October 1940, Gandhi and Nehru, abandoning their original stand of supporting Britain, decided to launch a limited civil disobedience campaign in which leading advocates of Indian independence were selected to participate one by one. Nehru was arrested and sentenced to four years' imprisonment. On 15 January 1941, Gandhi had stated:

Some say Jawaharlal and I were estranged. It will require much more than a difference of opinion to estrange us. We had differences from the time we became co-workers and yet I have said for some years and say so now that not Rajaji but Jawaharlal will be my successor. After spending a little more than a year in jail, Nehru was released, along with other Congress prisoners, three days before the bombing of Pearl Harbor in Hawaii.

Japan attacks India, Cripps' mission, Quit India: 1942 

When the Japanese carried their attack through Burma (now Myanmar) to the borders of India in the spring of 1942, the British government, faced by this new military threat, decided to make some overtures to India, as Nehru had originally desired. Prime Minister Winston Churchill dispatched Sir Stafford Cripps, a member of the War Cabinet who was known to be politically close to Nehru and knew Jinnah, with proposals for a settlement of the constitutional problem. As soon as he arrived, he discovered that India was more deeply divided than he had imagined. Nehru, eager for a compromise, was hopeful; Gandhi was not. Jinnah had continued opposing the Congress: "Pakistan is our only demand, and by God, we will have it," he declared in the Muslim League newspaper Dawn. Cripps' mission failed as Gandhi would accept nothing less than independence. Relations between Nehru and Gandhi cooled over the latter's refusal to co-operate with Cripps, but the two later reconciled.

In 1942, Gandhi called on the British to leave India; Nehru, though reluctant to embarrass the allied war effort, had no alternative but to join Gandhi. Following the Quit India resolution passed by the Congress party in Bombay on 8 August 1942, the entire Congress working committee, including Gandhi and Nehru, was arrested and imprisoned. Most of the Congress working committee including Nehru, Abdul Kalam Azad, Sardar Patel were incarcerated at the Ahmednagar Fort until 15 June 1945.

In prison 1943–1945 

During the period when all the Congress leaders were in jail, the Muslim League under Jinnah grew in power. In April 1943, the League captured the governments of Bengal and, a month later, that of the North-West Frontier Province. In none of these provinces had the League previously had a majority—only the arrest of Congress members made it possible. With all the Muslim dominated provinces except Punjab under Jinnah's control, the concept of a separate Muslim State was turning into a reality. However, by 1944, Jinnah's power and prestige were waning.

A general sympathy towards the jailed Congress leaders was developing among Muslims, and much of the blame for the disastrous Bengal famine of 1943–44 during which two million died had been laid on the shoulders of the province's Muslim League government. The numbers at Jinnah's meetings, once counted in thousands, soon numbered only a few hundred. In despair, Jinnah left the political scene for a stay in Kashmir. His prestige was restored unwittingly by Gandhi, who had been released from prison on medical grounds in May 1944 and had met Jinnah in Bombay in September. There, he offered the Muslim leader a plebiscite in the Muslim areas after the war to see whether they wanted to separate from the rest of India. Essentially, it was an acceptance of the principle of Pakistan—but not in so many words. Jinnah demanded that the exact words be used. Gandhi refused and the talks broke down. Jinnah, however, had greatly strengthened his own position and that of the League. The most influential member of Congress had been seen to negotiate with him on equal terms.

Cabinet mission, Interim government 1946–1947 

Nehru and his colleagues were released prior to the arrival of the British 1946 Cabinet Mission to India to propose plans for the transfer of power. The agreed plan in 1946 led to elections to the provincial assemblies. In turn, the members of the assemblies elected members of the Constituent Assembly. Congress won the majority of seats in the assembly and headed the interim government, with Nehru as the prime minister. The Muslim League joined the government later with Liaquat Ali Khan as the Finance member.

Prime Minister of India (1947–1964) 

Nehru served as prime minister for 18 years, initially as the interim prime minister, then from 1947 as the prime minister of the Dominion of India and then from 1950 as the prime minister of the Republic of India.

Republicanism 
In July 1946, Nehru pointedly observed that no princely state could prevail militarily against the army of independent India. In January 1947, he said that independent India would not accept the divine right of kings. In May 1947, he declared that any princely state which refused to join the Constituent Assembly would be treated as an enemy state. Vallabhbhai Patel and V. P. Menon were more conciliatory towards the princes, and as the men charged with integrating the states, were successful in the task. During the drafting of the Indian constitution, many Indian leaders (except Nehru) were in favour of allowing each princely state or covenanting state to be independent as a federal state along the lines suggested originally by the Government of India Act 1935. But as the drafting of the constitution progressed, and the idea of forming a republic took concrete shape, it was decided that all the princely states/covenanting states would merge with the Indian republic.

In 1963, Nehru brought in legislation making it illegal to demand for secession and introduced the Sixteenth Amendment to the Constitution which makes it necessary for those running for office to take an oath that says "I will uphold the sovereignty and integrity of India".

Nehru's daughter, Indira Gandhi, as prime minister, derecognised all the rulers by presidential order in 1969, a decision struck down by the Supreme Court of India. Eventually, her government by the 26th amendment to the constitution was successful in derecognising these former rulers and ending the privy purse paid to them in 1971.

Independence, Dominion of India: 1947–1950 

The period before independence in early 1947 was impaired by outbreaks of communal violence and political disorder, and the opposition of the Muslim League led by Muhammad Ali Jinnah, who were demanding a separate Muslim state of Pakistan.

Independence 
He took office as the prime minister of India on 15 August and delivered his inaugural address titled "Tryst with Destiny".

Long years ago we made a tryst with destiny, and now the time comes when we shall redeem our pledge, not wholly or in full measure, but very substantially. At the stroke of the midnight hour, when the world sleeps, India will awake to life and freedom. A moment comes, which comes but rarely in history when we step out from the old to the new when an age ends, and when the soul of a nation, long suppressed, finds utterance. It is fitting that at this solemn moment we take the pledge of dedication to the service of India and her people and to the still larger cause of humanity.

Assassination of Mahatma Gandhi: 1948 

On 30 January 1948, Gandhi was shot while he was walking in the garden of Birla House on his way to address a prayer meeting. The assassin, Nathuram Godse, was a Hindu nationalist with links to the extremist Hindu Mahasabha party, who held Gandhi responsible for weakening India by insisting upon a payment to Pakistan. Nehru addressed the nation by radio:

Friends and comrades, the light has gone out of our lives, and there is darkness everywhere, and I do not quite know what to tell you or how to say it. Our beloved leader, Bapu as we called him, the father of the nation, is no more. Perhaps I am wrong to say that; nevertheless, we will not see him again, as we have seen him for these many years, we will not run to him for advice or seek solace from him, and that is a terrible blow, not only for me but for millions and millions in this country.

Yasmin Khan argued that Gandhi's death and funeral helped consolidate the authority of the new Indian state under Nehru and Patel. The Congress tightly controlled the epic public displays of grief over a two-week period—the funeral, mortuary rituals and distribution of the martyr's ashes with millions participating at different events. The goal was to assert the power of the government, legitimise the Congress party's control and suppress all religious paramilitary groups. Nehru and Patel suppressed the Rashtriya Swayamsevak Sangh (RSS), the Muslim National Guards, and the Khaksars, with some 200,000 arrests. Gandhi's death and funeral linked the distant state with the Indian people and helped them to understand the need to suppress religious parties during the transition to independence for the Indian people. In later years, there emerged a revisionist school of history which sought to blame Nehru for the partition of India, mostly referring to his highly centralised policies for an independent India in 1947, which Jinnah opposed in favour of a more decentralised India.

Integration of states and Adoption of New Constitution: 1947–1950 

The British Indian Empire, which included present-day India, Pakistan, and Bangladesh, was divided into two types of territories: the Provinces of British India, which were governed directly by British officials responsible to the Viceroy of India; and princely states, under the rule of local hereditary rulers who recognised British suzerainty in return for local autonomy, in most cases as established by a treaty. Between 1947 and about 1950, the territories of the princely states were politically integrated into the Indian Union under Nehru and Sardar Patel. Most were merged into existing provinces; others were organised into new provinces, such as Rajputana, Himachal Pradesh, Madhya Bharat, and Vindhya Pradesh, made up of multiple princely states; a few, including Mysore, Hyderabad, Bhopal and Bilaspur, became separate provinces. The Government of India Act 1935 remained the constitutional law of India pending adoption of a new Constitution.

The new Constitution of India, which came into force on 26 January 1950 (Republic Day), made India a sovereign democratic republic. The new republic was declared to be a "Union of States".

Election of 1952 

After the adoption of the constitution on 26 November 1949, the Constituent Assembly continued to act as the interim parliament until new elections. Nehru's interim cabinet consisted of 15 members from diverse communities and parties. The first elections to Indian legislative bodies (National parliament and State assemblies ) under the new constitution of India were held in 1952. Various members of the cabinet resigned from their posts and formed their own parties to contest the elections. During that period, the then Congress party president, Purushottam Das Tandon, also resigned his post because of differences with Nehru and since Nehru's popularity was needed for winning elections. Nehru, while being the prime minister, was elected the president of Congress for 1951 and 1952. In the election, despite numerous competing parties, the Congress party under Nehru's leadership won large majorities at both state and national level.

First term as Prime Minister: 1952–1957

State reorganisation 
In December 1953, Nehru appointed the States Reorganisation Commission to prepare for the creation of states on linguistic lines. Headed by Justice Fazal Ali, the commission itself was also known as the Fazal Ali Commission. Govind Ballabh Pant, who served as Nehru's home minister from December 1954, oversaw the commission's efforts. The commission created a report in 1955 recommending the reorganisation of India's states.

Under the Seventh Amendment, the existing distinction between Part A, Part B, Part C, and Part D states was abolished. The distinction between Part A and Part B states was removed, becoming known simply as [[States of india|states''']]. A new type of entity, the union territory, replaced the classification as a Part C or Part D state. Nehru stressed commonality among Indians and promoted pan-Indianism, refusing to reorganise states on either religious or ethnic lines.

 Subsequent elections: 1957, 1962 
In the 1957 elections, Under the leadership of Nehru, the Indian National Congress easily won a second term in power, taking 371 of the 494 seats. They gained an extra seven seats (the size of the Lok Sabha had been increased by five) and their vote share increased from 45.0% to 47.8%. The INC won nearly five times more votes than the Communist Party, the second largest party.

In 1962, Nehru led the Congress to victory with a diminished majority. The numbers who voted for Communist and socialist parties grew, although some right-wing groups like Bharatiya Jana Sangh also did well.

 1961 annexation of Goa 

After years of failed negotiations, Nehru authorised the Indian Army to invade Portuguese-controlled Portuguese India (Goa) in 1961, and then he formally annexed it to India. It increased his popularity in India, but he was criticised by the communist opposition in India for the use of military force.

 Sino-Indian War of 1962 

From 1959, in a process that accelerated in 1961, Nehru adopted the "Forward Policy" of setting up military outposts in disputed areas of the Sino-Indian border, including in 43 outposts in territory not previously controlled by India. China attacked some of these outposts, and the Sino-Indian War began, which India lost. The war ended with China announcing a unilateral ceasefire and with its forces withdrawing to 20 kilometers behind the line of actual control of 1959.

The war exposed the unpreparedness of India's military, which could send only 14,000 troops to the war zone in opposition to the much larger Chinese Army, and Nehru was widely criticised for his government's insufficient attention to defence. In response, defence minister V. K. Krishna Menon had resigned and Nehru sought US military aid. Nehru's improved relations with the US under John F. Kennedy proved useful during the war, as in 1962, the president of Pakistan (then closely aligned with the Americans) Ayub Khan was made to guarantee his neutrality regarding India, threatened by "communist aggression from Red China". India's relationship with the Soviet Union, criticised by right-wing groups supporting free-market policies, was also seemingly validated. Nehru would continue to maintain his commitment to the non-aligned movement, despite calls from some to settle down on one permanent ally.

The aftermath of the war saw sweeping changes in the Indian military to prepare it for similar conflicts in the future and placed pressure on Nehru, who was seen as responsible for failing to anticipate the Chinese attack on India. Under American advice (by American envoy John Kenneth Galbraith who made and ran American policy on the war as all other top policymakers in the US were absorbed in the coincident Cuban Missile Crisis) Nehru refrained from using the Indian air force to beat back the Chinese advances. The CIA later revealed that, at that time, the Chinese had neither the fuel nor runways long enough to use their air force effectively in Tibet. Indians, in general, became highly sceptical of China and its military. Many Indians view the war as a betrayal of India's attempts at establishing a long-standing peace with China and started to question Nehru's usage of the term Hindi-Chini bhai-bhai (Indians and Chinese are brothers). The war also put an end to Nehru's earlier hopes that India and China would form a strong Asian Axis to counteract the increasing influence of the Cold War bloc superpowers.

The unpreparedness of the army was blamed on Defence Minister Menon, who "resigned" his government post to allow for someone who might modernise India's military further. India's policy of weaponisation using indigenous sources and self-sufficiency began in earnest under Nehru, completed by his daughter Indira Gandhi, who later led India to a crushing military victory over rival Pakistan in 1971. Toward the end of the war, India had increased her support for Tibetan refugees and revolutionaries, some of them having settled in India, as they were fighting the same common enemy in the region. Nehru ordered the raising of an elite Indian-trained "Tibetan Armed Force" composed of Tibetan refugees, which served with distinction in future wars against Pakistan in 1965 and 1971.

During the conflict, Nehru wrote two urgent letters to US President John F. Kennedy, requesting 12 squadrons of fighter jets and a modern radar system. These jets were seen as necessary to increase Indian air strength so that air-to-air combat could be initiated safely from the Indian perspective (bombing troops was seen as unwise for fear of Chinese retaliatory action). Nehru also asked that these aircraft be manned by American pilots until Indian airmen were trained to replace them. The Kennedy Administration (which was involved in the Cuban Missile Crisis during most of the Sino-Indian War) rejected these requests, leading to a cooling of Indo-US relations. According to former Indian diplomat G Parthasarathy, "only after we got nothing from the US did arms supplies from the Soviet Union to India commence". According to Time magazine's 1962 editorial on the war, however, this may not have been the case. The editorial states,When Washington finally turned its attention to India, it honoured the ambassador's pledge, loaded 60 US planes with $5,000,000 worth of automatic weapons, heavy mortars, and land mines. Twelve huge C-130 Hercules transports, complete with US crews and maintenance teams, took off for New Delhi to fly Indian troops and equipment to the battle zone. Britain weighed in with Bren and Sten guns and airlifted 150 tons of arms to India. Canada prepared to ship six transport planes. Australia opened Indian credits for $1,800,000 worth of munitions.

 Popularity 

To date, Nehru is considered the most popular prime minister winning three consecutive elections with around 45% of the vote. A Pathé News archive video reporting Nehru's death remarks "neither on the political stage nor in moral stature was his leadership ever challenged". In his book Verdicts on Nehru Ramachandra Guha cited a contemporary account that described what Nehru's 1951–52 Indian general election campaign looked like:Almost at every place, city, town, village or wayside halt, people had waited overnight to welcome the nation's leader. Schools and shops closed; milkmaids and cowherds had taken a holiday; the kisan and his helpmate took a temporary respite from their dawn-to-dusk programme of hard work in field and home. In Nehru's name, stocks of soda and lemonade sold out; even water became scarce . . . Special trains were run from out-of-the-way places to carry people to Nehru's meetings, enthusiasts travelling not only on footboards but also on top of carriages. Scores of people fainted in milling crowds.

In the 1950s, Nehru was admired by world leaders such as British prime minister Winston Churchill, and US president Dwight D. Eisenhower. A letter from Eisenhower to Nehru, dated 27 November 1958, read: Universally you are recognised as one of the most powerful influences for peace and conciliation in the world. I believe that because you are a world leader for peace in your individual capacity, as well as a representative of the largest neutral nation.... In 1955, Churchill called Nehru, the light of Asia, and a greater light than Gautama Buddha. Nehru is time and again described as a charismatic leader with a rare charm.

Nehru as an able statesman has been noted for his openness towards criticism from the opposition. Atal Bihari Vajpayee, a prominent leader of the then opposition party Jan Sangh and the 10th Prime Minister of India, once recalled that during a debate in the parliament he commented on Nehru that "Panditji, you have a dual personality. You show characteristics of both Churchill and Chamberlain." Vajpayee said Nehru appreciated for his words. Vajpayee added that such kinds of criticisms were only possibly in those times. That time, Nehru had predicted that Vajpayee would become Prime Minister of India one day. Other admirers of Nehru from opposing parties included George Fernandes who joined the socialist movement subject to the precondition that Nehru would not be replaced.

 Vision and governing policies 

According to Bhikhu Parekh, Nehru can be regarded as the founder of the modern Indian state. Parekh attributes this to the national philosophy Nehru formulated for India. For him, modernisation was the national philosophy, with seven goals: national unity, parliamentary democracy, industrialisation, socialism, development of the scientific temper, and non-alignment. In Parekh's opinion, the philosophy and the policies that resulted from this benefited a large section of society such as public sector workers, industrial houses, middle and upper peasantry. However, it failed to benefit the urban and rural poor, the unemployed and the Hindu fundamentalists.

After the exit of Subhash Chandra Bose from mainstream Indian politics (because of his support of violence in driving the British out of India), the power struggle between the socialists and conservatives in the Congress party balanced out. However, the death of Vallabhbhai Patel in 1950 left Nehru as the sole remaining iconic national leader, and soon the situation became such that Nehru could implement many of his basic policies without hindrance Nehru's daughter, Indira Gandhi, was able to fulfil her father's dream by the 42nd amendment (1976) of the Indian constitution by which India officially became "socialist" and "secular", during the state of emergency she imposed.

 Economic policies 

Nehru implemented policies based on import substitution industrialisation and advocated a mixed economy where the government-controlled public sector would co-exist with the private sector. He believed the establishment of basic and heavy industry was fundamental to the development and modernisation of the Indian economy. The government, therefore, directed investment primarily into key public sector industries—steel, iron, coal, and power—promoting their development with subsidies and protectionist policies.

The policy of non-alignment during the Cold War meant that Nehru received financial and technical support from both power blocs in building India's industrial base from scratch. Steel mill complexes were built at Bokaro and Rourkela with assistance from the Soviet Union and West Germany. There was substantial industrial development. Industry grew 7.0% annually between 1950 and 1965—almost trebling industrial output and making India the world's seventh largest industrial country. Nehru's critics, however, contended that India's import substitution industrialisation, which was continued long after the Nehru era, weakened the international competitiveness of its manufacturing industries. India's share of world trade fell from 1.4% in 1951–1960 to 0.5% between 1981 and 1990. However, India's export performance is argued to have showed actual sustained improvement over the period. The volume of exports grew at an annual rate of 2.9% in 1951–1960 to 7.6% in 1971–1980.

GDP and GNP grew 3.9 and 4.0% annually between 1950 and 1951 and 1964–1965. It was a radical break from the British colonial period, but the growth rates were considered anaemic at best compared to other industrial powers in Europe and East Asia. India lagged behind the miracle economies (Japan, West Germany, France, and Italy). State planning, controls, and regulations were argued to have impaired economic growth. While India's economy grew faster than both the United Kingdom and the United States, low initial income and rapid population increase meant that growth was inadequate for any sort of catch-up with rich income nations.

Nehru's preference for big state-controlled enterprises created a complex system of quantitative regulations, quotas and tariffs, industrial licenses, and a host of other controls. This system, known in India as Licence Raj, was responsible for economic inefficiencies that stifled entrepreneurship and checked economic growth for decades until the liberalisation policies initiated by the Congress government in 1991 under P. V. Narasimha Rao.

 Agriculture policies 
Under Nehru's leadership, the government attempted to develop India quickly by embarking on agrarian reform and rapid industrialisation. A successful land reform was introduced that abolished giant landholdings, but efforts to redistribute land by placing limits on landownership failed. Attempts to introduce large-scale cooperative farming were frustrated by landowning rural elites, who formed the core of the powerful right-wing of the Congress and had considerable political support in opposing Nehru's efforts. Agricultural production expanded until the early 1960s, as additional land was brought under cultivation and some irrigation projects began to have an effect. The establishment of agricultural universities, modelled after land-grant colleges in the United States, contributed to the development of the economy. These universities worked with high-yielding varieties of wheat and rice, initially developed in Mexico and the Philippines, that in the 1960s began the Green Revolution, an effort to diversify and increase crop production. At the same time, a series of failed monsoons would cause serious food shortages, despite the steady progress and an increase in agricultural production.

 Social policies 
 Education 
Nehru was a passionate advocate of education for India's children and youth, believing it essential for India's future progress. His government oversaw the establishment of many institutions of higher learning, including the All India Institute of Medical Sciences, the Indian Institutes of Technology, the Indian Institutes of Management and the National Institutes of Technology. Nehru also outlined a commitment in his five-year plans to guarantee free and compulsory primary education to all of India's children. For this purpose, Nehru oversaw the creation of mass village enrolment programs and the construction of thousands of schools. Nehru also launched initiatives such as the provision of free milk and meals to children to fight malnutrition. Adult education centres, vocational and technical schools were also organised for adults, especially in the rural areas.

 Hindu marriage law 
Under Nehru, the Indian Parliament enacted many changes to Hindu law to criminalise caste discrimination and increase the legal rights and social freedoms of women.

Nehru specifically wrote Article 44 of the Indian constitution under the Directive Principles of State Policy which states: "The State shall endeavor to secure for the citizens a uniform civil code throughout the territory of India." The article has formed the basis of secularism in India. However, Nehru has been criticised for the inconsistent application of the law. Most notably, he allowed Muslims to keep their personal law in matters relating to marriage and inheritance. In the small state of Goa, a civil code based on the old Portuguese Family Laws was allowed to continue, and Nehru prohibited Muslim personal law. This resulted from the annexation of Goa in 1961 by India, when Nehru promised the people that their laws would be left intact. This has led to accusations of selective secularism.

While Nehru exempted Muslim law from legislation and they remained unreformed, he passed the Special Marriage Act in 1954. The idea behind this act was to give everyone in India the ability to marry outside the personal law under a civil marriage. The law applied to all of India, except Jammu and Kashmir, again leading to accusations of selective secularism. In many respects, the act was almost identical to the Hindu Marriage Act, 1955, demonstrates how secularised the law regarding Hindus had become. The Special Marriage Act allowed Muslims to marry under it and keep the protections, generally beneficial to Muslim women, that could not be found in the personal law. Under the act, polygamy was illegal, and inheritance and succession would be governed by the Indian Succession Act, rather than the respective Muslim personal law. Divorce would be governed by the secular law, and maintenance of a divorced wife would be along the lines set down in the civil law.

 Reservations for socially-oppressed communities 
A system of reservations in government services and educational institutions was created to eradicate the social inequalities and disadvantages faced by peoples of the Scheduled Castes and Scheduled Tribes. Nehru convincingly succeeded secularism and religious harmony, increasing the representation of minorities in government.

 Language policy 
Nehru led the faction of the Congress party, which promoted Hindi as the lingua franca of the Indian nation. After an exhaustive and divisive debate with the non-Hindi speakers, Hindi was adopted as the official language of India in 1950, with English continuing as an associate official language for 15 years, after which Hindi would become the sole official language. Efforts by the Indian Government to make Hindi the sole official language after 1965 were unacceptable to many non-Hindi Indian states, which wanted the continued use of English. The Dravida Munnetra Kazhagam (DMK), a descendant of Dravidar Kazhagam, led the opposition to Hindi. To allay their fears, Nehru enacted the Official Languages Act in 1963 to ensure the continuing use of English beyond 1965. The text of the Act did not satisfy the DMK and increased their scepticism that future administrations might not honour his assurances. The Congress Government headed by Indira Gandhi eventually amended the Official Languages Act in 1967 by to guarantee the indefinite use of Hindi and English as official languages. This effectively ensured the current "virtual indefinite policy of bilingualism" of the Indian Republic.

 Foreign policy 

Throughout his long tenure as the prime minister, Nehru also held the portfolio of External Affairs.  His idealistic approach focused on giving India a leadership position in nonalignment. He sought to build support among the newly independent nations of Asia and Africa in opposition to the two hostile superpowers contesting the Cold War.

 The Commonwealth 

After independence, Nehru wanted to maintain good relations with Britain and other British commonwealth countries. As prime minister of the Dominion of India, he signed the 1949 London Declaration, under which India agreed to remain within the Commonwealth of Nations after becoming a republic in January 1950, and to recognise the British monarch as a "symbol of the free association of its independent member nations and as such the Head of the Commonwealth". The other nations of the Commonwealth recognised India's continuing membership of the association.

 Non-aligned movement 

On the international scene, Nehru was an opponent of military action and military alliances. He was a strong supporter of the United Nations, except when it tried to resolve the Kashmir question. He pioneered the policy of non-alignment and co-founded the Non-Aligned Movement of nations professing neutrality between the rival blocs of nations led by the US and the USSR. Recognising the People's Republic of China soon after its founding (while most of the Western bloc continued relations with Taiwan), Nehru argued for its inclusion in the United Nations and refused to brand the Chinese as the aggressors in their conflict with Korea. He sought to establish warm and friendly relations with China in 1950 and hoped to act as an intermediary to bridge the gulf and tensions between the communist states and the Western bloc.

Nehru was a key organiser of the Bandung Conference of April 1955, which brought 29 newly independent nations together from Asia and Africa, and was designed to galvanise the nonalignment movement under Nehru's leadership. He envisioned it as his key leadership opportunity on the world stage, where he would bring together the emerging nations. Instead, the Chinese representative, Zhou Enlai, who downplayed revolutionary communism and acknowledged the right of all nations to choose their own economic and political systems, including even capitalism upstaged him. Nehru and his top foreign-policy aide, V.K. Krishna Menon, by contrast gained an international reputation as rude and undiplomatic. Zhou said privately, "I have never met a more arrogant man than Mr. Nehru." A senior Indian foreign office official characterised Menon as "an outstanding world statesman but the world's worst diplomat," adding that he was often "overbearing, churlish and vindictive".

 Defence and nuclear policy 
While averse to war, Nehru led the campaigns against Pakistan in Kashmir. He used military force to annex Hyderabad in 1948 and Goa in 1961. While laying the foundation stone of the National Defence Academy in 1949, he stated:We, who for generations had talked about and attempted in everything a peaceful way and practised non-violence, should now be, in a sense, glorifying our army, navy and air force. It means a lot. Though it is odd, yet it simply reflects the oddness of life. Though life is logical, we have to face all contingencies, and unless we are prepared to face them, we will go under. There was no greater prince of peace and apostle of non-violence than Mahatma Gandhi...but yet, he said it was better to take the sword than to surrender, fail or run away. We cannot live carefree assuming that we are safe. Human nature is such. We cannot take the risks and risk our hard-won freedom. We have to be prepared with all modern defence methods and a well-equipped army, navy, and air force."Mahatma Gandhi's relevant quotes, "My non-violence does not admit of running away from danger and leaving dear ones unprotected. Between violence and cowardly flight, I can only prefer violence to cowardice. Non-violence is the summit of bravery."
"I do believe that, where there is only a choice between cowardice and violence, I would advise violence." "I would rather have India resort to arms in order to defend her honour than that she should in a cowardly manner become or remain a helpless witness to her own dishonour." – All Men Are Brothers Life and Thoughts of Mahatma Gandhi as told in his own words. UNESCO. pp. 85–108.

Nehru entrusted Homi J. Bhabha, a nuclear physicist, with complete authority over all nuclear-related affairs and programs and answerable only to the prime minister.

Many hailed Nehru for working to defuse global tensions and the threat of nuclear weapons after the Korean War (1950–1953). He commissioned the first study of the effects of nuclear explosions on human health and campaigned ceaselessly for the abolition of what he called "these frightful engines of destruction". He also had pragmatic reasons for promoting de-nuclearization, fearing a nuclear arms race would lead to over-militarisation that would be unaffordable for developing countries such as his own.

 Defending Kashmir 

At Lord Mountbatten's urging, in 1948, Nehru had promised to hold a plebiscite in Kashmir under the auspices of the UN. Kashmir was a disputed territory between India and Pakistan, the two having gone to war over it in 1947. However, as Pakistan failed to pull back troops in accordance with the UN resolution, and as Nehru grew increasingly wary of the UN, he declined to hold a plebiscite in 1953. His policies on Kashmir and integrating of the state into India were frequently defended before the United Nations by his aide, V. K. Krishna Menon, who earned a reputation in India for his passionate speeches.

In 1953, Nehru orchestrated the ouster and arrest of Sheikh Abdullah, the prime minister of Kashmir, whom he had previously supported but now suspected of harbouring separatist ambitions; Bakshi Ghulam Mohammad replaced him.

Menon was instructed to deliver an unprecedented eight-hour speech defending India's stand on Kashmir in 1957; to date, the speech is the longest ever delivered in the United Nations Security Council, covering five hours of the 762nd meeting on 23 January, and two hours and forty-eight minutes on the 24th, reportedly concluding with Menon's collapse on the Security Council floor. During the filibuster, Nehru moved swiftly and successfully to consolidate Indian power in Kashmir (then under great unrest). Menon's passionate defence of Indian sovereignty in Kashmir enlarged his base of support in India and led to the Indian press temporarily dubbing him the "Hero of Kashmir". Nehru was then at the peak of his popularity in India; the only (minor) criticism came from the far-right.

 China 

In 1954, Nehru signed with China the Five Principles of Peaceful Coexistence, known in India as the Panchsheel (from the Sanskrit words, panch: five, sheel: virtues), a set of principles to govern relations between the two states. Their first formal codification in treaty form was in an agreement between China and India in 1954, which recognised Chinese sovereignty over Tibet. They were enunciated in the preamble to the "Agreement (with exchange of notes) on Trade and Intercourse between Tibet Region of China and India", which was signed at Peking on 29 April 1954. Negotiations took place in Delhi from December 1953 to April 1954 between the Delegation of the People's Republic of China (PRC) Government and the Delegation of the Indian Government on the relations between the two countries regarding the disputed territories of Aksai Chin and South Tibet. By 1957, Chinese premier Zhou Enlai had also persuaded Nehru to accept the Chinese position on Tibet, thus depriving Tibet of a possible ally, and of the possibility of receiving military aid from India. The treaty was disregarded in the 1960s, but in the 1970s, the Five Principles again came to be seen as important in China–India relations, and more generally as norms of relations between states. They became widely recognised and accepted throughout the region during the premiership of Indira Gandhi and the three-year rule of the Janata Party (1977–1980). Although the Five Principles of Peaceful Coexistence were the basis of the 1954 Sino-Indian border treaty, in later years, Nehru's foreign policy suffered from increasing Chinese assertiveness over border disputes and his decision to grant asylum to the 14th Dalai Lama.

Dag Hammarskjöld, the second secretary-general of the United Nations, said that while Nehru was superior from a moral point of view, Zhou Enlai was more skilled in realpolitik.

 United States 

In 1956, Nehru criticised the joint invasion of the Suez Canal by the British, French, and Israelis. His role, both as Indian prime minister and a leader of the Non-Aligned Movement, was significant; he tried to be even-handed between the two sides while vigorously denouncing Anthony Eden and co-sponsors of the invasion. Nehru had a powerful ally in the US president Dwight Eisenhower who, if relatively silent publicly, went to the extent of using America's clout at the International Monetary Fund to make Britain and France back down. During the Suez crisis, Nehru's right-hand man, Menon attempted to persuade a recalcitrant Gamal Nasser to compromise with the West and was instrumental in moving Western powers towards an awareness that Nasser might prove willing to compromise.

 Assassination attempts and security 

There were four known assassination attempts on Nehru. The first attempt was made during partition in 1947 while he was visiting the North-West Frontier Province (now in Pakistan) in a car. A second was by Baburao Laxman Kochale, a knife-wielding rickshaw-puller, near Nagpur in 1955. The third attempt took place in Bombay in 1956, and the fourth was a failed bombing attempt on train tracks in Maharashtra in 1961. Despite threats to his life, Nehru despised having too much security around him and did not like to disrupt traffic because of his movements.

 Death 

Nehru's health began declining steadily in 1962. In the spring of 1962, he was affected with viral infection over which he spent most of April in bed. In the next year, through 1963, he spent months recuperating in Kashmir. Some writers attribute this dramatic decline to his surprise and chagrin over the Sino-Indian War, which he perceived as a betrayal of trust. Upon his return from Dehradun on 26 May 1964, he was feeling quite comfortable and went to bed at about 23:30 as usual. He had a restful night until about 06:30. Soon after he returned from the bathroom, Nehru complained of pain in the back. He spoke to the doctors who attended on him for a brief while, and almost immediately he collapsed. He remained unconscious until he died at 13:44. His death was announced in the Lok Sabha at 14:00 local time on 27 May 1964; the cause of death was believed to be a heart attack. Draped in the Indian national Tri-colour flag, the body of Jawaharlal Nehru was placed for public viewing. "Raghupati Raghava Rajaram" was chanted as the body was placed on the platform. On 28 May, Nehru was cremated in accordance with Hindu rites at the Shantivan on the banks of the Yamuna, witnessed by 1.5 million mourners who had flocked into the streets of Delhi and the cremation grounds.

US President Lyndon B. Johnson remarked on his death:-

History has already recorded his monumental contribution to the molding of a strong and independent India. And yet, it is not just as a leader of India that he has served humanity. Perhaps more than any other world leader he has given expression to man's yearning for peace. This is the issue of our age. In his fearless pursuit of a world free from war he has served all humanity.

Soviet Premier Nikita Khrushchev remarked:-

He was a passionate fighter for peace in the whole world and an ardent champion of the realization of the principles of peaceful coexistence of states; he was the inspirer of the policy of Non-Alignment promoted by the Indian Government. This reasonable policy won India respect and due to it, India is now occupying a worthy place in the international arena.

Nehru's death left India with no clear political heir to his leadership. Lal Bahadur Shastri later succeeded Nehru as the prime minister. 

The death was announced to the Indian parliament in words similar to Nehru's own at the time of Gandhi's assassination: "The light is out."  India's future prime minister Atal Bihari Vajpayee famously delivered Nehru an acclaimed eulogy. He hailed Nehru as Bharat Mata's "favourite prince" and likened him to the Hindu god Rama.

Positions held

 Key cabinet members and associates 
Nehru served as the prime minister for eighteen years, first as interim prime minister during 1946–1947 during the last year of the British Raj and then as prime minister of independent India from 15 August 1947 to 27 May 1964.

B. R. Ambedkar, the law minister in the interim cabinet, also chaired the Constitution Drafting Committee.

Vallabhbhai Patel served as home minister in the interim government. He was instrumental in getting the Congress party working committee to vote for partition. He is also credited with integrating peacefully most of the princely states of India. Patel was a long-time comrade to Nehru but died in 1950, leaving Nehru as the unchallenged leader of India until his own death in 1964.

Maulana Azad was the First Minister of Education in the Indian government Minister of Human Resource Development (until 25 September 1958, Ministry of Education). His contribution to establishing the education foundation in India is recognised by celebrating his birthday as National Education Day across India.

Jagjivan Ram became the youngest minister in Nehru's Interim government of India, a labour minister and also a member of the Constituent Assembly of India, where, as a member of the dalit caste, he ensured that social justice was enshrined in the Constitution. He went on to serve as a minister with various portfolios during Nehru's tenure and in Shastri and Indira Gandhi governments.

Morarji Desai was a nationalist with anti-corruption leanings but socially conservative, pro-business, and in favour of free enterprise reforms, as opposed to Prime Minister Jawaharlal Nehru's socialistic policies. After serving as chief minister of Bombay state, he joined Nehru's cabinet in 1956 as the finance minister of India. he held that position until 1963 when he along with other senior ministers in Nehru cabinet resigned under the Kamaraj plan.The
plan, as proposed by Madras chief Minister K.Kamaraj, was to revert government ministers to party positions after a
certain tenure and vice versa.With Nehru's age and health failing in the early 1960s, Desai was considered as a possible contender for the position of Prime Minister. Later  Desai alleged that Nehru used the Kamaraj Plan to remove all possible contenders ‘from the path of his daughter, Indira Gandhi. Desai succeeded Indira Gandhi as the prime minister in 1977 when he was selected by the victorious Janata alliance as their parliamentary leader.

Govind Ballabh Pant (1887–1961) was a key figure in the Indian independence movement and later a pivotal figure in the politics of Uttar Pradesh (UP) and in the Indian Government. Pant served in Nehru's cabinet as Union home minister from 1955 until his death in 1961. As home minister, his chief achievement was the re-organisation of states along linguistic lines. He was also responsible for the establishment of Hindi as an official language of the central government and a few states. During his tenure as the home minister, Pant was awarded the Bharat Ratna.

C. D. Deshmukh was one of five members of the Planning Commission when it was constituted in 1950 by a cabinet resolution. Deshmukh succeeded John Mathai as the Union Finance Minister in 1950 after Mathai resigned in protest over the transfer of certain powers to the Planning Commission. As finance minister, Deshmukh remained a member of the Planning Commission. Deshmukh's tenure—during which he delivered six budgets and an interim budget—is noted for the effective management of the Indian economy and its steady growth which saw it recover from the impacts of the events of the 1940s. During Deshmukh's tenure, the State Bank of India was formed in 1955 through the nationalisation and amalgamation of the Imperial Bank with several smaller banks. He accomplished the nationalisation of insurance companies and the formation of the Life Insurance Corporation of India through the Life Insurance Corporation of India Act, 1956. Deshmukh resigned over the Government's proposal to move a bill in Parliament bifurcating Bombay State into Gujarat and Maharashtra while designating the city of Bombay a Union territory.

V. K. Krishna Menon (1896–1974) was a close associate of Nehru, and has been described by some as the second most powerful man in India during Nehru's tenure as prime minister. Under Nehru, he served as India's high commissioner to the UK, UN ambassador, and union minister of defence. He was resigned after the debacle of the 1962 China war.

In the years following independence, Nehru frequently turned to his daughter Indira Gandhi for managing his personal affairs.  Indira moved into Nehru's official residence to attend to him and became his constant companion in his travels across India and the world. She would virtually become Nehru's chief of staff. Towards the end of the 1950s, Indira Gandhi served as the president of the Congress. In that capacity, she was instrumental in getting the Communist led Kerala State Government dismissed in 1959. Indira was elected as Congress party president in 1959, which aroused criticism for alleged nepotism, although Nehru had actually disapproved of her election, partly because he considered that it smacked of "dynasticism"; he said, indeed it was "wholly undemocratic and an undesirable thing", and refused her a position in his cabinet. Indira herself was at loggerheads with her father over policy; most notably, she used his oft-stated personal deference to the Congress Working Committee to push through the dismissal of the Communist Party of India government in the state of Kerala, over his own objections. Nehru began to be embarrassed by her ruthlessness and disregard for parliamentary tradition and was "hurt" by what he saw as assertiveness with no purpose other than to stake out an identity independent of her father.

 Relationships 
After Kamala's death in 1936, Nehru was rumoured to have relationships with certain women from time to time. These included Shraddha Mata, Padmaja Naidu and Edwina Mountbatten. Countess Mountbatten's daughter Lady Pamela Hicks acknowledged Nehru's platonic relationship with Lady Mountbatten.

British historian Philip Ziegler, with access to the private letters and diaries, concludes the relationship:
was to endure until Edwina Mountbatten's death: intensely loving, romantic, trusting, generous, idealistic, even spiritual. If there was any physical element it can only have been of minor importance to either party. [India's Governor-General] Mountbatten's reaction was one of pleasure....He liked and admired Nehru, it was useful to him that the Prime Minister should find such attractions in the Governor-General's home, it was agreeable to find Edwina almost permanently in good temper: the advantages of the alliance were obvious.

Nehru's sister, Vijaya Lakshmi Pandit told Pupul Jayakar, Indira Gandhi's friend and biographer, that Padmaja Naidu and Nehru lived together for many years.

 Religion and personal beliefs 

Described as a Hindu agnostic, and styling himself as a "scientific humanist", Nehru thought that religious taboos were preventing India from moving forward and adapting to modern conditions: "No country or people who are slaves to dogma and dogmatic mentality can progress, and unhappily our country and people have become extraordinarily dogmatic and little-minded."

As a humanist, Nehru considered that his afterlife was not in some mystical heaven or reincarnation but in the practical achievements of a life lived fully with and for his fellow human beings: “…Nor am I greatly interested in life after death. I find the problems of this life sufficiently absorbing to fill my mind,” he wrote. In his Last Will and Testament he wrote: “I wish to declare with all earnestness that I do not want any religious ceremonies performed for me after my death. I do not believe in such ceremonies, and to submit to them, even as a matter of form, would be hypocrisy and an attempt to delude ourselves and others.”

In his autobiography, he analysed Abrahamic and Indian religions and their impact on India. He wanted to model India as a secular country; his secularist policies remain a subject of debate.

 Legacy 

Jawaharlal Nehru, next to Mahatma Gandhi, is regarded as the most significant figure of the Indian independence movement that successfully ended the British rule over Indian subcontinent.

As India's first Prime minister and external affairs minister, Nehru played a major role in shaping modern India's government and political culture along with sound foreign policy. He is praised for creating a system providing universal primary education, reaching children in the farthest corners of rural India. Nehru's education policy is also credited for the development of world-class educational institutions like the All India Institute of Medical Sciences, Indian Institutes of Technology, and the Indian Institutes of Management.

In addition, Nehru's stance as an unfailing nationalist led him to implement policies that stressed commonality among Indians while still appreciating regional diversities. This proved particularly important as post-Independence differences surfaced, since British withdrawal from the subcontinent prompted regional leaders to no longer relate to one another as allies against a common adversary. While differences in culture and, especially, language threatened the unity of the new nation, Nehru established programs such as the National Book Trust and the National Literary Academy which promoted the translation of regional literatures between languages and organised the transfer of materials between regions. In pursuit of a single, unified India, Nehru warned, "Integrate or perish."

Called an "architect of Modern India", he is widely recognized as the greatest figure of modern India after Mahatma Gandhi. On the occasion of his first death anniversary in 1965, Sarvepalli Radhakrishnan, Lal Bahadur Shastri and others described Nehru as the greatest figure of India after Gandhi. 

Writing in 2005, Ramachandra Guha wrote that while no other Indian prime minister was ever close to the challenges that Nehru dealt with and if Nehru had died in 1958 then he would be remembered as the greatest statesman of 20th century. However, in the recent years, Nehru's reputation has seen re-emergence and he is credited for keeping India together contrary to predictions of many that the country was bound to fall apart.

 Commemoration 

In his lifetime, Jawaharlal Nehru enjoyed an iconic status in India and was widely admired across the world for his idealism and statesmanship. Nehru's ideals and policies continue shaping the Congress Party's manifesto and core political philosophy. His birthday, 14 November is celebrated in India as Bal Divas ("Children's Day") in recognition of his lifelong passion and work for the welfare, education and development of children and young people. Children across India remember him as Chacha Nehru ("Uncle Nehru"). Nehru remains a popular symbol of the Congress Party which frequently celebrates his memory. people often emulate his style of clothing, especially the Gandhi cap and the Nehru jacket. Nehru's preference for the sherwani ensured it continues to be considered formal wear in North India today.

 Many public institutions and memorials across India are dedicated to Nehru's memory. The Jawaharlal Nehru University in Delhi is among the most prestigious universities in India. The Jawaharlal Nehru Port near the city of Mumbai is a modern port and dock designed to handle a huge cargo and traffic load. Nehru's residence in Delhi is preserved as the Teen Murti House now has Nehru Memorial Museum & Library, and one of five Nehru Planetariums that were set in Mumbai, Delhi, Bangalore, Allahabad and Pune. The complex also houses the offices of the Jawaharlal Nehru Memorial Fund, established in 1964 under the chairmanship of Sarvepalli Radhakrishnan, then president of India. The foundation also gives away the prestigious Jawaharlal Nehru Memorial Fellowship, established in 1968. The Nehru family homes at Anand Bhavan and Swaraj Bhavan are also preserved to commemorate Nehru and his family's legacy. In 2012, Nehru was ranked number four in Outlooks poll of The Greatest Indian.

 In popular culture 

There have been many documentaries about Nehru's life, and he has been portrayed in fictionalised films. The canonical performance is probably that of Roshan Seth, who played him three times: in Richard Attenborough's 1982 film Gandhi, Shyam Benegal's 1988 television series Bharat Ek Khoj, based on Nehru's The Discovery of India, and in a 2007 TV film entitled The Last Days of the Raj. Benegal directed the 1984 documentary film Nehru, covering his political career. Indian film director Kiran Kumar made a film about Nehru titled Nehru: The Jewel of India in 1990 starring Partap Sharma in the titular role. In Ketan Mehta's film Sardar, Benjamin Gilani portrayed Nehru. Naunihal, a 1967 Indian Hindi-language drama film by Raj Marbros, follows Raju, an orphan, who believes that Jawaharlal Nehru is his relative and sets out to meet him. 

Similarly, in the 1957 film Ab Dilli Dur Nahin by Amar Kumar, Rattan, a young boy, travels to Delhi and seeks to avert the death sentence of his wrongly convicted father by asking Prime Minister Nehru for help. Another 1957 English language short documentary Our Prime Minister was produced, compiled and directed by Ezra Mir, who also directed Three weeks in the life of Prime Minister Nehru in 1962. Girish Karnad's historical play, Tughlaq (1962) is an allegory about the Nehruvian era. It was staged by Ebrahim Alkazi with the National School of Drama Repertory at Purana Qila, Delhi in the 1970s and later at the Festival of India, London in 1982.

 Writings 
Nehru was a prolific writer in English who wrote The Discovery of India, Glimpses of World History, An Autobiography (released in the United States as "Toward Freedom,") and Letters from a Father to His Daughter, all written in jail. Letters comprised 30 letters written to his daughter Indira Priyadarshani Nehru (later Gandhi) who was then 10 years old and studying at a boarding school in Mussoorie. It attempted to instruct her about natural history and world civilisations.

Nehru's books have been widely read. An Autobiography, in particular, has been critically acclaimed. John Gunther, writing in Inside Asia, contrasted it with Gandhi's autobiography: The Mahatma's placid story compares to Nehru's as a cornflower to an orchid, a rhyming couplet to a sonnet by MacLeish or Auden, a water pistol to a machine gun. Nehru's autobiography is subtle, complex, discriminating, infinitely cultivated, steeped in doubt, suffused with intellectual passion. Lord Halifax once said that no one could understand India without reading it; it is a kind of 'Education of Henry Adams,' written in superlative prose—hardly a dozen men alive write English as well as Nehru ...

Michael Brecher, who considered Nehru to be an intellectual for whom ideas were important aspects of Indian nationalism, wrote in Political Leadership and Charisma: Nehru, Ben-Gurion, and Other 20th-Century Political Leaders: Nehru's books were not scholarly, nor were they intended to be. He was not a trained historian, but his feel for the flow of events and his capacity to weave together a wide range of knowledge in a meaningful pattern give to his books qualities of a high order. In these works, he also revealed a sensitive literary style.  ... Glimpses of World History is the most illuminating on Nehru as an intellectual. The first of the trilogy, Glimpses, was a series of thinly connected sketches of the story of mankind in the form of letters to his teenage daughter, Indira, later prime minister of India. ... Despite its polemical character in many sections and its shortcomings as an impartial history, Glimpses is a work of great artistic value, a worthy precursor of his noble and magnanimous Autobiography.

Michael Crocker thought An Autobiography would have given Nehru literary fame had the political fame eluded him:It is to his years in prison that we owe his three main books, ... Nehru's writings illustrate a cerebral life, and a power of self-discipline, altogether out of the ordinary. Words by the million bubbled up out of his fullness of mind and spirit. Had he never been prime minister of India he would have been famous as the author of the Autobiography and the autobiographical parts of The Discovery of India. An Autobiography, at least with some excisions here and there, is likely to be read for generations. ... There are, for instance, the characteristic touches of truism and anticlimax, strange in a man who could both think and, at his best, write so well ...

Nehru's speech A Tryst With Destiny was rated by the British newspaper The Guardian to be among the great speeches of the 20th-century. Ian Jack wrote in his introduction to the speech: Dressed in a golden silk jacket with a red rose in the buttonhole, Nehru rose to speak. His sentences were finely made and memorable – Nehru was a good writer; his Discovery of India stands well above the level reached by most politician-writers. ... The nobility of Nehru's words – their sheer sweep – provided the new India with a lodestone that was ambitious and humane. Post-colonialism began here as well as Indian democracy, which has since outlived many expectations of its death.

 Awards and honours 
In 1948, Nehru was conferred an honorary doctorate by the University of Mysore. He later received honorary doctorates from the University of Madras, Columbia University, and Keio University.

In 1955, Nehru was awarded the Bharat Ratna, India's highest civilian honour. President Rajendra Prasad awarded him the honour without taking advice from the Prime Minister as would be the normal constitutional procedure as Nehru himself was Prime Minister then.

 See also 

 Foreign relations of India
 List of political families
 List of Indian writers
 Scientific temper, a phrase popularised by Nehru

 References 
 Notes 

 Citations 

 Bibliography 

  Gopal, S. and Uma Iyengar, eds The Essential Writings of Jawaharlal Nehru (Oxford University Press, 2003) 
 Autobiography: Toward freedom, Oxford University Press
 Letters for a Nation: From Jawaharlal Nehru to His Chief Ministers 1947–1963 (Penguin UK, 2015).
 Letters from a father to his daughter by Jawaharlal Nehru, Children's Book Trust
  Independence and After: A collection of the more important speeches of Jawaharlal Nehru from September 1946 to May 1949 (1949). Delhi: The Publications Division, Government of India.
 A Tryst With Destiny historic speech made by Jawaharlal Nehru on 14 August 1947
 

 Further reading 

 Bayly, C. A. "The Ends of Liberalism and the Political Thought of Nehru's India." Modern Intellectual History 12.3 (2015): 605–626.
 Nehru: A Political Biography by Michael Brecher (1959). London:Oxford University Press.
 "Nehru, Jawaharlal." in Ainslie T. Embree, ed., Encyclopedia of Asian History. Vol. 3. Charles Scribner's Sons. New York. (1988): 98–100.
 Fonseca, Rena. "Nehru and the Diplomacy of Nonalignment." The Diplomats, 1939–1979 (Princeton University Press, 2019) pp. 371–397. online
 
 Gopal, Sarvapelli. "Nehru and minorities." Economic and Political Weekly (1988): 2463–2466. online
 Gopal, Sarvepalli. "The Formative Ideology of Jawaharlal Nehru." Economic and Political Weekly (1976): 787–792 online.
 Gopal, Sarvepalli.  Jawaharlal Nehru: A Biography Volume 1 1889–1947 (1975); Jawaharlal Nehru Vol.2 1947–1956 (1979); Jawaharlal Nehru: A Biography Volume 3 1956–1964 (2014), a major scholarly biography; excerpt vol 1
 Guha, Ramachandra. "Jawaharlal Nehru." in Makers of Modern Asia (Harvard University Press, 2014) pp. 117–146.
  Heimsath, C.H. and Surjit Mansingh. A diplomatic history of modern India (1971) online
 
 Louro, Michele L. Comrades against imperialism: Nehru, India, and interwar internationalism (Cambridge UP, 2018).
 Malone, David et al. eds. The Oxford Handbook of Indian Foreign Policy. (2015) excerpt; a comprehensive overview by over 50 leading experts.

 Purushotham, Sunil. "World history in the atomic age: Past, present and future in the political thought of Jawaharlal Nehru." Modern Intellectual History 14.3 (2017): 837–867.
 Raghavan, Srinath. War and peace in modern India (Springer, 2016); focus on Nehru's foreign policy
 Raghavan, Srinath. The Most Dangerous Place: A History of the United States in South Asia. (Penguin Random House India, 2018); also published as Fierce Enigmas: A History of the United States in South Asia.(2018). online review
 
 Tharoor, Shashi. Nehru: The Invention of India (2003) Arcade Books 
 Tyson, Geoffrey.  Nehru: The Years of Power (1966). London: Pall Mall Press.
 Zachariah, Benjamin. Nehru (2004) excerpt

 External links 
 Jawaharlal Nehru at official website of Indian National Congress
 Jawaharlal Nehru at Encyclopædia Britannica
 Jawaharlal Nehru at official website of Prime Minister's Office (India)
 70th Anniversary of Indian Independence – Nehru's Birthday Dinner Programme – UK Parliament Living Heritage
 Profile of Nehru in India Today''
 Nehru on Communalism
 Jawaharlal Nehru materials in the South Asian American Digital Archive (SAADA)
 
 
 Jawaharlal Nehru at BBC

 
Kashmiri Hindus
1889 births
1964 deaths
India MPs 1952–1957
20th-century Indian lawyers
20th-century Indian philosophers
20th-century Indian writers
India MPs 1957–1962
India MPs 1962–1967
Alumni of the Inns of Court School of Law
Alumni of Trinity College, Cambridge
Asian democratic socialists
Indian agnostics
Indian barristers
Indian humanists
Indian independence activists
Indian National Army trials
Indian nationalists
Indian socialists
Kashmiri people
Lok Sabha members from Uttar Pradesh
Members of the Constituent Assembly of India
Nehru administration
Nehru–Gandhi family
People educated at Harrow School
People from Allahabad
20th-century prime ministers of India
Presidents of the Indian National Congress
Prime Ministers of India
Prisoners and detainees of British India
Recipients of the Bharat Ratna
Recipients of the Order of the Companions of O. R. Tambo
Writers from Uttar Pradesh
Members of the Fabian Society
Finance Ministers of India
Ministers for Corporate Affairs
Commerce and Industry Ministers of India
Defence Ministers of India
Members of the Cabinet of India
Members of the Inner Temple
Failed assassination attempts in Asia
Members of the Council of the Governor General of India